Aurdal may mean:

Nord-Aurdal, a municipality in Innlandet county, Norway
Aurdal, a village in Nord-Aurdal municipality in Innlandet county, Norway
Sør-Aurdal, a municipality in Innlandet county, Norway
Aurdal Township, Minnesota, a township in Otter Tail county, Minnesota, United States

People 
Olaf Aurdal (born 1939), Norwegian politician

See also